Life Is Good is the second studio album by Canadian country music artist Gord Bamford. It was released on October 19, 2004 by GWB Records and distributed by Royalty Records. Six singles were released from the album: "Heroes," "My Heart's a Genius," "All About Her," "Life Is Good" and "I Would for You."

Critical reception
Jared Majeski of Canadian Online Explorer gave the album a positive review. He calls the album "a very personal and intimate look into Bamford's life." He goes on to say that Bamford "sings about his parents, his past and his passions. With the recent birth of his first child, Bamford's life isn't just good - it's great."

Track listing
"Heroes" (Gord Bamford, Casey Moore, Dean Pezderic, Duane Steele) - 3:22
"My Heart's a Genius" (Gord Bamford, Byron Hill) - 3:24
"Politically Incorrect" (Gord Bamford, Byron Hill) - 3:27
"Joe's Place" (Mike Dekle, Byron Hill) - 2:37
"All About Her" (Gord Bamford, Steve Fox) - 3:31
"I Would for You" (Gord Bamford, Byron Hill) - 3:20
"Stubborn Blood" (Gord Bamford, Steve Fox, Tim Taylor) - 3:08
"We're All Cowboys" (Gord Bamford, Byron Hill) - 3:30
"Life Is Good" (Gord Bamford, Byron Hill) - 2:50
"The Watering Hole" (Gord Bamford, Byron Hill) - 2:26
"Kendra's Song" (Gord Bamford, Tim Taylor) - 3:15

Personnel
 Gord Bamford - lead vocals
 Jeff Bradshaw - steel guitar
 Jimmy Carter - bass guitar
 J.T. Corenflos - electric guitar
 Ryan Davidson - acoustic guitar, electric guitar
 Glen Duncan - fiddle, mandolin, banjo
 Brad Johner - background vocals
 Becky Moonen - background vocals
 Billy Panda - acoustic guitar
 Mike Rojas - organ, piano, synthesizer, Wurlitzer
 Paul Scholten - drums, percussion

References

External links
[ allmusic ((( Life Is Good > Overview )))]

2004 albums
Gord Bamford albums
Royalty Records albums
Albums produced by Byron Hill